Louis Muhlstock,  LL.D. (April 23, 1904 August 26, 2001) was a Canadian painter best known for his depictions of the Great Depression and for landscapes and urban scenes in and around Montreal.

Career
Born in Narajów, Galicia, Austria-Hungary, Muhlstock emigrated to Montreal in 1911. He worked as a bookkeeper during the day and at night studied art at the Council of Arts and Manufacturers, at the school of the Art Association of Montreal with William Brymner, attended Royal Canadian Academy evening classes with Maurice Cullen and others, and also at the Ecole des Beaux-Arts of Montreal (1922–1928). From 1928 to 1931, he studied art in Paris with the figure painter Louis Biloul, also sketching at the Académie de la Grande Chaumière and exhibiting his work at the Paris salons. He spent summers sketching in the provinces or visiting museums in Belgium (1928–1931). He returned to Montreal to become a full-time painter.

In 1937, he showed his work in Toronto with the Picture Loan Society. Afterwards, his work was shown at many galleries in both solo and group exhibitions. In 1996, an 80-piece retrospective exhibited Muhlstock's work at galleries in Québec, as well as in Edmonton. In 2010, his work was exhibited as part of the McCord Museum's Jewish Painters of Montreal: Witnesses of Their Time, 1930-1948.

He was a member of the Canadian Group of Painters, the Canadian Society of Graphic Art, The Federation of Canadian Artists and the Contemporary Arts Society.

Honours
In 1978, he was awarded a Doctor of Laws, honoris causa from Concordia University. In 1990, he was made an Officer of the Order of Canada. In 1998, he was made a Knight of the National Order of Quebec.

References

Bibliography 

1904 births
2001 deaths
People from Ternopil Oblast
20th-century Canadian painters
Canadian male painters
Artists from Montreal
Austro-Hungarian emigrants to Canada
Canadian people of Ukrainian-Jewish descent
20th-century Canadian Jews
Jewish Canadian artists
Jewish painters
Jews from Galicia (Eastern Europe)
Knights of the National Order of Quebec
Officers of the Order of Canada
20th-century Canadian male artists
Jews and Judaism in Montreal